Auguste Gougeard (15 November 1827 – 8 March 1886, Paris) was a French counsellor, naval officer and politician. He rose to captain and campaigned in Africa, the Crimea and the Far East. He was made général de division of the auxiliary army to the armée de la Loire, under Alfred Chanzy's command. A friend of Léon Gambetta, he served as Naval Minister from 14 November 1881 to 29 January 1882 in Gambetta's temporary ministry. He was a commander of the Légion d'honneur. He wrote several works, including a series on the French Navy and its institutions.

Sources
http://viaf.org/viaf/233329196

1827 births
1886 deaths
French Navy officers
French Naval Ministers
French military personnel of the Crimean War
Commandeurs of the Légion d'honneur